Åke Andersson (22 April 1917 – 20 July 1983) was a Swedish football forward who played for Sweden in the 1938 FIFA World Cup. He also played for GAIS.

References

External links 
 FIFA profile

1917 births
1983 deaths
Swedish footballers
Sweden international footballers
Association football forwards
GAIS players
1938 FIFA World Cup players